Moncton Southwest is a provincial electoral district for the Legislative Assembly of New Brunswick, Canada.  It was contested in the 2014 general election, having been created in the 2013 redistribution of electoral boundaries.

The district was includes the southwestern corner of the city of Moncton and some surrounding communities.  It was created out of parts of the old districts of Moncton North, Petitcodiac, Moncton West and Moncton Crescent.

Members of the Legislative Assembly

Election results

References

External links 
Website of the Legislative Assembly of New Brunswick
Map of riding as of 2018

New Brunswick provincial electoral districts
Politics of Moncton